Newman is an unincorporated community in Otero County, New Mexico, United States.

References

Unincorporated communities in New Mexico
Unincorporated communities in Otero County, New Mexico